Rubropsichia santaremana is a species of moth of the family Tortricidae. It is found in Brazil.

The wingspan is about 16.5 mm. The ground colour of the forewings is dark orange, with distinct bluish refractive marks. The hindwings are orange with brown-black fascia.

References

Moths described in 2009
Rubropsichia
Moths of South America
Taxa named by Józef Razowski